Cook is a railway station and crossing loop located in the Australian state of South Australia on the Trans-Australian Railway.

Cook is the only scheduled stop on the Nullarbor Plain for the Indian Pacific transcontinental passenger train and has little other than curiosity value for passengers strolling around while their train is replenished.

History
Cook was established in 1917 on the Nullarbor Plain when the Trans-Australian Railway was built. It is named after the sixth Prime Minister of Australia, Joseph Cook. When the town was a major Commonwealth Railways centre for track maintenance and locomotive and rolling stock repairs, it supported a school and hospital. At that time, railway employees and their families depended on two weekly provisions trains for the delivery of supplies. When the town was populated, water was pumped from an underground artesian aquifer but later, all water was carried in by train.

The short 1955 film Nullarbor Hideout was set in and around Cook; the first scenes give a good impression of the railway line and infrastructure, and a sense of the townspeople's isolation and their dependence on the railway.

Today
In 2009, Cook was said to have a resident population of four. The town was effectively closed in 1997 when the Australian National Railways' assets were sold to railway operating companies. The reliability of diesel locomotives and the introduction of concrete sleepers and continuously welded rail rendered resident employees redundant. Track and facilities maintenance is undertaken by contractors and diesel refuelling facilities remain; there is overnight accommodation for resting train crews. 

The former airstrip is known as a place to spot inland dotterel.

As of 2016, Cook was officially described as an "unbounded locality" which is not used as an address. Since 2013, it has been administratively classified as being in the locality of Nullarbor.

Climate

See also 

 Localities on the Trans-Australian Railway

References

Railway stations in South Australia
Railway stations in Australia opened in 1917
Ghost towns in South Australia
Populated places established in 1917
Places in the unincorporated areas of South Australia
Nullarbor Plain
Trans-Australian Railway